Qizleq (also Romanized as Qīzleq; also known as Qezleq) is a village in Charuymaq-e Jonubesharqi Rural District, Shadian District, Charuymaq County, East Azerbaijan Province, Iran. At the 2006 census, its population was 39, in 8 families.

References 

Populated places in Charuymaq County